Gryphea dilatata, common name "devil's toenail" is a species of Jurassic oyster,  an extinct marine bivalve mollusc in the family Gryphaeidae.

This fossil oyster is frequently found in abundance in the localities where it occurs.

It lived a sedentary life-style, settled on the sea bed and was a filter feeder. Its abundance at certain localities — such as Furzy Cliff, Weymouth, Dorset, (England) — suggests it often formed large beds of hundreds of individuals.

It is closely related to the similar species Gryphaea dilobotes.

See also
 Gryphaea arcuata
 Jurassic Coast

References

Prehistoric bivalves
Gryphaeidae
Jurassic bivalves
Bivalves described in 1818